Daurala is a town and a nagar panchayat in Meerut district  in the state of Uttar Pradesh, India.

Geography
It has an average elevation of 223 metres (731 feet). Daurala is situated 84 km in north from national capital Delhi. Daurala town falls on national highway 58 and has a dual right angled metalled road to make a square route (Chaudhary Charan Singh Chowk), one of this road is joining Daurala to Baraut while other to national highway 119 at Masuri (meerut). The construction of a new flyover that connects commuter to Sardhana village has been completed.

Demographics
 India census, Daurala had a population of 10,684. Males constitute 54% of the population and females 46%. Daurala has an average literacy rate of 56%, lower than the national average of 59.5%: male literacy is 65% and, female literacy is 45%. In Daurala, 17% of the population is under 6 years of age.

References

Cities and towns in Meerut district